Orconectes pellucidus, the Mammoth Cave crayfish, is a freshwater crayfish native to karst landscapes in Kentucky and Tennessee in the United States. 

The common name refers to the Mammoth Cave National Park, however it also occurs outside of the park. An alternative common name, the eyeless crayfish refers to its troglomorphic adaptions to its subterranean habitat.

References

Cambaridae
Cave crayfish
Freshwater crustaceans of North America
Crustaceans described in 1844